The 2002–03 Ukrainian First League was the twelfth season of the Ukrainian First League which was won by Zirka Kirovohrad. The season started on July 6, 2002, and finished on June 21, 2003.

Promotion and relegation

Promoted teams
Five clubs promoted from the 2001–02 Ukrainian Second League.
Group A
 FC Krasyliv – champion (debut)
 Sokil Zolochiv – runner-up (debut)
Group B
 Systema-Boreks Borodyanka – champion (debut)
Group C
 FC Sumy – champion (returning after a season)
 Arsenal Kharkiv – runner-up (debut)

Relegated teams 
One club was relegated from the 2001-02 Ukrainian Top League:
 FC Zakarpattia Uzhhorod – 14th place (returning after a season)

Renamed teams
 Before the season FC Sumy changed back to FC Spartak Sumy .
 During winter break SC Mykolaiv changed its name to MFC Mykolaiv.

Teams
In 2002-03 season, the Ukrainian First League consists of the following teams:

Final table

Top scorers 
Statistics are taken from here.

References

External links

Ukrainian First League seasons
2002–03 in Ukrainian association football leagues
Ukra